Satyadaman was a ruler of the Western Satraps (ruled 197-198 CE). He was the son of king Damajadasri I and brother of Jivadaman, who had been king, but sometime before him.

Notes

References
 Rapson, "Catalogue of the coins of the Andhra dynasty, the Western Ksatrapas, the Traikutaka dynasty, and the "Bodhi" dynasty"

Western Satraps